Thomas Bateman (1821–1861) was an English antiquary.

Thomas Bateman may also refer to:

Thomas Bateman (physician) (1778–1821), British physician and dermatology pioneer
Tom Bateman (politician) (1922–2003), Australian politician
Tom Bateman (actor) (born 1989), English actor
Tom Bateman (British Army officer), British general

See also
Bateman (disambiguation)